Saahil Arora, better known as Universe, is an American former professional Dota 2 player. He was a member of the Evil Geniuses team that won The International 2015.

History 
Universe began his Dota career in 2011. Universe finished 9th at The International 2013 as a member of Team Dignitas. He finished 3rd at The International 2014 and won The International 2015, both as a member of Evil Geniuses (EG), and made the series-clinching play known as the "6 Million Dollar Echo Slam". EG also finished third at the Frankfurt Major 2015.

Evil Geniuses took third place at the Shanghai Major 2016. In March 2016, Arteezy and UNiVeRsE left the team to join Team Secret. He would then leave Team Secret to rejoin Evil Geniuses after the end of the Manila Major 2016 in June, effectively trading places with Sam "Bulba" Sosale.

Evil Geniuses also won the Manila Masters tournament in May 2017. Later on The International 2017 tournament, EG got a 9th-12th finish. During post-tournament shuffles, the team lost their support player Zai, who was replaced by former team member and coach Fear. Since leaving Evil Geniuses in 2017, he has played for Fnatic, Forward Gaming, and Ninjas in Pyjamas.

In April 2020, Universe retired from competitive Dota 2.

References

External links

Living people
American esports players
American people of Indian descent
American people of Punjabi descent
American Hindus
Dignitas (esports) players
Dota players
Evil Geniuses players
Ninjas in Pyjamas players
People from Madison, Wisconsin
Team Secret players
Year of birth missing (living people)